Gulfer is a Canadian rock band from Montreal, Quebec, Canada. They formed in 2011 and are composed of David Mitchell (bass/vocals), Vincent Ford (vocals/guitar), Joe Therriault (guitar/vocals) and Julien Daoust (drums). Their sound makes use of odd time signatures, tapping, clean guitar tones, shifting tonal dynamics, and introspective lyrics. The band's music has similarities to This Town Needs Guns, Sport (France), I Love Your Lifestyle (Sweden), Tangled Hair, You Blew It and Dryjacket. The band has released three albums and several EPs and splits. In March 2018 they released their second studio album Dog Bless,  and in 2020 their third, self-titled album.

Discography
Studio albums
 What Gives (2015) via Big Scary Monsters (EU), Friend Of Mine Records (Japan) & Texas Is Funny Records (US)
 Dog Bless (2018) via Big Scary Monsters (EU), Friend Of Mine Records (Japan) & Topshelf Records (US)
 Gulfer (2020) via Royal Mountain Records (Canada) & Topshelf Records (US)

EPs
 Transcendals (2013) via Friend Of Mine Records

Splits
 Split with Fago.Sepia (2012)
 Splits (2013)
 Foureign Friends split (2014) via Enjoyment Records
 Dawgz split (2014) via Stack Your Roster
 Split with Del Paxton (2015) via Topshelf Records

Compilations
 Anthology (2020); a collection of early splits from 2012-2013 via Topshelf Records

Live albums
 Live in Japan (2020)

Members
 Vincent Ford - lead vocals, guitar (2011–present)
 David Mitchell - bass, vocals (2011–present)
 Joe Therriault - guitar, backing vocals (2016–present)
 Julien Daoust - drums  (2016–present)
 Caden Clinton - friend (2018–present)

Former members
 Steven Whiteley - guitar, trumpet (2013–2015)
 Simon Maillé - drums (2011–2015)

References

Musical groups from Montreal
Musical groups established in 2011
Canadian alternative rock groups
Math rock groups
Topshelf Records artists
2011 establishments in Quebec
Big Scary Monsters Recording Company artists